The Student African American Brotherhood (SAAB), with over 168 chapters in the United States and abroad, was founded on the campus of Georgia Southwestern State University in Americus, Georgia on October 17, 1990. SAAB mentors young African American men by educating them on their responsibilities as United States citizens. The overall objective of the program is to make each young man aware of his potential, purpose, and life goals; however, much emphasis is focused on leadership development and training.

Responding to the needs of African American males at the University, Founder Dr. Tyrone Bledsoe had a vision to create an organization that would provide student development intervention and support to African American men enrolled in college.

He further designed Student African American Brotherhood as a black male development model, necessary to assist African American men in developing a more complete understanding of their responsibilities as college students and in being U.S. citizens.

The First International SAAB Leadership Institute was held at the University of Toledo in Toledo, Ohio March 4–6, 2004 under the theme, "Strength For Your Journey: Voices of the Past". Brothers from various chapters were able to meet with other brothers who held similar goals and aspirations.

The Student African American Brotherhood members serve their communities through mentorship, role modeling, and programming that highlights the experiences of African American culture as well as black men’s roles in society.

History 
The story of SAAB began in 1990 when it was established by Dr. Tyrone Bledsoe on October 17, 1990 on the campus of Georgia Southwestern State University.  The organization was established to address the academic and social challenges of African American males at Georgia Southwestern and has many collegiate and high school chapters around the country. SAAB is an organization committed to providing opportunities for at-risk males in high school and college. SAAB believes it is a professional organization with members that serve as role models for inner-city neighborhoods throughout the country. 
SAAB tries to assists men of color to realize and achieve their fullest potential by upholding a caring outlook and to transform themselves by changing their attitudes, mentoring their fellow brothers and providing positive leadership within their community. The organization’s commitment to enhancing the school and life experiences of underprivileged men of color is fueled by the synergy of the college campus and the concept of graduating from high school and college as a means to survival and self-sufficiency. By mobilizing and developing human capital through our student participants, SAAB hopes to infuse our society with a culture of young men that will make a national impact and empower all people through appropriate mentoring and role modeling despite social disparities, to achieve an education and in turn play an active role in bettering the lives of others.

Dr. Tyrone Bledsoe 

Dr. Tyrone Bledsoe resides in Toledo, Ohio. He was born and raised in Grenada, Mississippi. He received his Bachelor of Arts Degree and Master’s of Education degree from Mississippi State University. He earned his Ph.D in Counseling and Student Affairs Administration from the University of Georgia; and was chosen as the Outstanding Doctoral Student in the State of Georgia and was recognized as the Outstanding Doctoral Alumnus by the University of Georgia.

He served as Vice President for Student Life and Special Assistant to the President at The University of Toledo but has transitioned temporarily to the role of Executive Director of the SAAB National Headquarters. He is the founder of SAAB, which is a national organization established to enhance the experiences of and instill a “spirit of care” in African American males in high schools, colleges and universities around the country. He is a contributing author of the book “African American Men in College”, Jossey-Bass Publisher.

He is a member of Phi Beta Sigma fraternity and is very active in the arena of higher education. He is recognized by several professional associations for his research, publications, presentations and scholarly work.  In 1999, he was invited to Oxford, England to serve as a guest lecturer to discuss his work with African American males at the Oxford University Roundtable Institute, which is sponsored by the British Council. Also, he was invited to join an international research team to address issues around men of color in Europe, Trinidad, Barbados and the Bahamas. He has appeared on talk shows such as “Perfect Union” hosted by Congressman Jesse Jackson, Jr. to discuss his work involving African American and Latino Males.
 
He is deemed as one of the most gifted and dynamic motivational speakers by the thousands who have heard him speak. He was chosen as one of the most outstanding social innovators in the world by the Ashoka International Organization. He seeks to be a spiritual and thought-provoking lecturer. And most importantly to him, he is the father of one adult son, Tyrone Bledsoe, Jr.

Chapter structure 
SAAB attempts to distinguish itself from other minority student programs in the following ways:
 A national success rate as a dynamic educational-based organization that serves thousands of young men at 180 middle schools, high schools; community colleges and four-year institutions with chapters that are at least 5 years old. Eighty Six percent (86%) of SAAB student members graduate from college, compared to a national average of 42% among black men in particular. 
 To become a SAAB member one must accept the charge to be a role model and a mentor. SAAB members are polite, sincere, hardworking, and encouraging; knowing that these characteristics are counter to the popular but offensive negative images of young black and brown men in America.
 SAAB members are required to tutor and mentor high school, middle school and elementary students as a way to seed the same caring spirit that SAAB promotes.
 When compared to other male support groups and fraternal organizations geared towards the same population, SAAB maintains stricter membership requirements that are unrelated to entertainment or sports. SAAB Chapters must adhere to annual membership requirements and core standards to remain part of the national network and comply with implementation fidelity desired across all chapters.

Membership 
SAAB membership is open to any student attending an institution that is a registered SAAB Chapter.

Successes 

SAAB believes its graduated are more prepared to be competitive in the professional world of work and serve as role models for inner-city neighborhoods throughout the country. Over the past decade, SAAB has helped to ensure the continued academic success of African American males by helping 80% of SAAB participants persist from their freshman to sophomore year and helping 86% of SAAB participants graduate. This success greatly exceeds the 42% national rate of retention for African American males that persist from their freshman to sophomore year and the 55% average national five-year graduation rate for Black males. The SAAB program has attracted national attention as an innovative prototype for personal and academic enrichment, and has been successfully expanded to serve students at both public and private four-year institutions, including both predominantly white and historically Black institutions.

References 

Student organizations in the United States
1990 establishments in Georgia (U.S. state)
Student organizations established in 1990